Son-Rise: The Miracle Continues is a biographical book by Barry Neil Kaufman published in 1994. It was revised and expanded from the original book, Son-Rise, which spawned into the NBC television movie Son-Rise: A Miracle of Love securing the Humanitas Prize award in the 90-minute category.

Kaufman tells of the excursion that he and his wife, Samahria, take to fully recover their eighteen-month-old son from severe autism and profound mental retardation. Diagnosticians told the Kaufmans that their son, Raun, was hopelessly incurable and that he should live in a lifelong facility.

References

Books about autism
American biographies